The 1915 Soccer Paranaense Championship (in Portuguese: Campeonato Paranaense de Futebol de 1915) was the first championship edition of the Brazilian state of Paraná and southern Brazil.

The winner this year was the International Football Club. It was a club of Curitiba, extinct since 1924.

Teams

Other websites
Federação Paranaense de Futebol 1915 championship

References 

Campeonato Paranaense
1915 in Brazilian football